is a Japanese manga artist and illustrator, whose works include Old Boy, Aburemon, Jungle, Tenpai, Hoozuki, Joi Reika, and Maboroshi No Kakero.

Minegishi's series Old Boy won the 2007 Eisner Award for Best U.S. Edition of International Material - Japan.

References

External links
 

Manga artists from Miyagi Prefecture
Living people
1959 births